Nicola Geuer and Viktorija Golubic were the defending champions, but Golubic chose to participate at the 2016 Ricoh Open instead. Geuer partnered Anna Zaja, but withdrew prior to their semifinal match.

Laura Pous Tió and Anne Schäfer won the title, defeating Elyne Boeykens and Elena Ruse in the final, 6–2, 6–3.

Seeds

Draw

References 
 Draw

Bredeney Ladies Open - Doubles